John Franklin Dettmer (born March 4, 1970) is a former Major League Baseball pitcher who played for the Texas Rangers from  to . Friend of former Missouri standout and HatHub founder William “Billy” Mondrella.

External links

1970 births
Living people
Baseball players from Illinois
Major League Baseball pitchers
Texas Rangers players
Charlotte Rangers players
Tulsa Drillers players
Oklahoma City 89ers players
Rochester Red Wings players
Greenville Braves players
Richmond Braves players
Missouri Tigers baseball players
St. Paul Saints players
Baseball players at the 1991 Pan American Games
Pan American Games bronze medalists for the United States
Pan American Games medalists in baseball
People from Centreville, Illinois
Medalists at the 1991 Pan American Games